Lumpy may refer to:

Film and television
 Lumpy Rutherford, a friend of Wally Cleaver in the television series Leave it to Beaver
 Lumpy the Heffalump, a character in Walt Disney Winnie-the-Pooh films and a television series
 Lumpy the cook, in the 2005 film King Kong
 Lumpy, a fictional moose in the American flash cartoon Happy Tree Friends
 Ed, in Cartoon Network's animated television series Ed, Edd n Eddy

People
 Hugh Brannum (1910–1987), American singer, arranger, composer and actor best known for playing "Mr. Green Jeans" on the children's television show Captain Kangaroo
 Tim Herron (born 1970), American golfer
 Lumpy Stevens (1735–1819), English cricketer

Other
 Lumpy Ridge, Rocky Mountain National Park, Colorado, United States
 TOM's Toyota LMP, a LeMans Prototype car nicknamed "Lumpy"
 LUMPY, original title of the 2012 film Best Man Down

Lists of people by nickname